Aldila Sutjiadi (born 2 May 1995) is an Indonesian professional tennis player.

Sutjiadi has a career-high WTA ranking of No. 344 in singles, achieved on 24 May 2021 and No. 32 in doubles, achieved on 6 March 2023. She has won three doubles titles on the WTA Tour and two doubles titles on the WTA Challenger Tour, as well as one singles and 15 doubles titles on the ITF Women's Circuit. She is currently the highest-ranked Indonesian tennis player in doubles on the WTA Tour.

At the 2018 Asian Games, Sutjiadi and Christopher Rungkat earned Indonesia its first tennis medal in 16 years. Seeded 11th in the mixed doubles competition, Sutjiadi/Rungkat defeated fifth seed Sonchat Ratiwatana/Luksika Kumkhum of Thailand in the final.

By winning her maiden WTA doubles title at the 2022 Copa Colsanitas alongside Astra Sharma, Sutjiadi became the first Indonesian tennis player to win a title on the WTA Tour since Angelique Widjaja won her last doubles title at the 2003 Wismilak International tournament in Bali.

Career

Junior Grand Slam results
Singles:
 Australian Open: 1R (2012, 2013)
 French Open: 1R (2012)
 Wimbledon: 2R (2012)
 US Open: –

Doubles:
 Australian Open: SF (2012)
 French Open: 2R (2012)
 Wimbledon: 1R (2012)
 US Open: –

2008–2020: Early career
Sutjiadi made her debut as a junior player in 2008, aged 13. Highlights of her junior career include winning the singles and doubles competition at the 2010 Indonesia International Junior Championships as well as reaching the doubles semifinals of the 2012 Australian Open Junior Championships.

In 2010, aged 15, Sutjiadi turned professional at an ITF Circuit tournament in Jakarta.

At 17, she won the gold medal in both singles and doubles at the 2012 Indonesian National Sports Week and made her debut for the Indonesia Fed Cup team the following year in 2013.

At the 2015 Southeast Asian Games in Singapore, Sutjiadi won bronze medals in women's doubles partnered with Jessy Rompies as well as in the women's team event alongside Rompies, Lavinia Tananta, and Ayu Fani Damayanti.

In 2017, Sutjiadi graduated from the University of Kentucky. As a varsity athlete playing for the Wildcats, Sutjiadi was named doubles All-American in 2016 and 2017, won Kentucky's first-ever national championship in doubles at the ITA National Indoors Championship alongside Mami Adachi in 2016, and was nominated for the 2017 NCAA Woman of the Year award.

At the 2018 Asian Games in Jakarta, competing alongside Christopher Rungkat in the mixed doubles competition, Sutjiadi won a gold medal for Indonesia by defeating Thai pair Luksika Kumkhum/Sonchat Ratiwatana. The pair also won the mixed doubles gold medal for Indonesia at the 2019 Southeast Asian Games in Manila by defeating Ratiwatana who paired up with Tamarine Tanasugarn. Sutjiadi also won gold medal in the singles competition by defeating Savanna Lý Nguyễn from Vietnam in the grand final.

2021–2022: WTA titles and top 100 in doubles
Sutjiadi/Rungkat defended their gold medal at the 2021 Southeast Asian Games in Bắc Ninh by defeating yet another Thai pair Patcharin Cheapchandej/Pruchya Isaro in the final.

In July 2021, Sutjiadi reached her first WTA 125 tournament final at the Charleston Pro partnering Erin Routliffe, but lost to Liang En-shuo/Rebecca Marino in three sets. In November 2021, partnering Peangtarn Plipuech, Sutjiadi again made the final of a WTA 125 tournament at the Midland Classic, this time losing to Harriet Dart/Asia Muhammad.

Thanks to her improved ranking, Sutjiadi began to play more on the main WTA Tour. In January 2022, she lost in the first qualifying round of Adelaide International 2, a WTA 250 tournament, against Danka Kovinić and in the first round of the doubles competition partnering Plipuech. Sutjiadi/Plipuech then received a wildcard to the doubles competition of the 2022 Australian Open. They lost to No. 5 seed Alexa Guarachi/Nicole Melichar-Martinez 6–4, 6–2 in the opening round.

Sutjiadi then competed alongside Astra Sharma in the doubles competition of the Copa Colsanitas. They defeated No. 2 seed Irina Bara/Ekaterine Gorgodze 6–4, 7–5 in the quarterfinals before scoring a comeback victory against Beatriz Haddad Maia/Camila Osorio 4–6, 7–5, [10–6] in the semifinal. In the final, Sutjiadi/Sharma defeated Tara Moore/Emina Bektas 4–6, 6–4, [11–9]. This was Sutjiadi's first WTA Tour title as well as the first title on the main tour for Indonesian tennis players since Angelique Widjaja won the doubles trophy alongside María Vento-Kabchi at the 2003 Wismilak International tournament in September 2003. After the tournament, Sutjiadi entered the top 100 ranking for the first time at No. 86. The following month, Sutjiadi partnered with Katarzyna Kawa to lift the trophy at the $100k LTP Charleston Pro Tennis by defeating Sophie Chang/Angela Kulikov 6–1, 6–4 in the final.

At the French Open, Sutjiadi began a new partnership with Japanese player Miyu Kato. They defeated Tereza Martincová/Andrea Petkovic 7–6, 2–6, 6–2 in the first round, which marks Sutjiadi's first ever match win at a major. In the second round, they fell to No. 4 seed Caty McNally/Zhang Shuai 6–3, 6–4. Sutjiadi continued her partnership with Kato at the Wimbledon Championships where they lost to Andrea Petkovic/Jule Niemeier 7–6, 5–7, 7–6 in the first round. They then lost their quarterfinal match at the Swedish Open to Jessy Rompies/Olivia Tjandramulia, the semifinal of the Ladies Open Lausanne to Ulrikke Eikeri/Tamara Zidanšek, and the final of the Hamburg European Open to Chang/Kulikov.

2023: Further success, third title, WTA 1000 quarterfinal & top 30 in doubles 
Kicking off her 2023 season, Sutjiadi reunited with Miyu Kato as the No. 3 seed in the doubles competition of Auckland Open. They went on to win their first title since pairing up after defeating Bethanie Mattek-Sands/Leylah Fernandez in a final match that saw them trailing 1–6, 1–5 before pulling off a 1–6, 7–5, [10-4] comeback victory. With this result, Sutjiadi rose to a new career-high of No. 37. They next competed at Hobart International and lost 6–7, 2–6 in the second round to Nadiia Kichenok and Kimberley Zimmermann. Seeded 16th at the Australian Open, Sutjiadi and Kato won their first two matches but fell 4–6, 2–6 in the third round to the second-seeded Americans Coco Gauff/Jessica Pegula.
At the inaugural edition of the 2023 ATX Open in Austin, Texas, she reached her second final of the season partnering New Zealander Erin Routliffe. She won her third title  defeating top seeds Nicole Melichar and Ellen Perez.
She continued her good form reaching the quarterfinals at the WTA 1000 2023 BNP Paribas Open with Kato with wins over Kirsten Flipkens and Bethanie Mattek-Sands and second seeded pair of Jessica Pegula and Coco Gauff from the United States.

Awards and nominations

Grand Slam doubles performance timeline

WTA career finals

Doubles: 4 (3 titles, 1 runner-up)

WTA Challenger finals

Doubles: 4 (2 titles, 2 runner-ups)

ITF Circuit finals

Singles: 4 (1 title, 3 runner–ups)

Doubles: 24 (15 titles, 9 runner–ups)

Note: Tournaments sourced  from official ITF archives

ITF Junior finals

Singles: 4 (3 titles, 1 runner-up)

Doubles: 12 (5 titles, 7 runner-ups)

Note: Tournaments sourced from official ITF archives

National representation

Multi-sport events
Sutjiadi made her debut representing Indonesia in multi-sport events at the 2015 Southeast Asian Games, she won the women's doubles bronze medal.

Singles: 2 (1 gold, 1 silver)

Doubles: 1 (bronze)

Mixed doubles: 3 (3 gold)

Billie Jean King Cup/Fed Cup participation
Sutjiadi made her Billie Jean King Cup/Fed Cup debut at age 17 against Philippines at the 2013 Asia/Oceania Group II qualifying in Astana, Kazakhstan.

Singles

Doubles

WTA Tour career earnings

Notes

References

External links
 
 
 

Indonesian female tennis players
1995 births
Living people
Sportspeople from Jakarta
Southeast Asian Games bronze medalists for Indonesia
Southeast Asian Games medalists in tennis
Tennis players at the 2018 Asian Games
Medalists at the 2018 Asian Games
Asian Games medalists in tennis
Asian Games gold medalists for Indonesia
Competitors at the 2015 Southeast Asian Games
Competitors at the 2019 Southeast Asian Games
Southeast Asian Games gold medalists for Indonesia
Kentucky Wildcats women's tennis players
Competitors at the 2021 Southeast Asian Games
21st-century Indonesian women